The 2008 Eurocup Mégane Trophy season was the fourth season of the Renault–supported touring car category, a one-make racing series that is part of the World Series by Renault. The season began at Circuit de Spa-Francorchamps on 3 May and finished at the Circuit de Barcelona-Catalunya on 19 October, after seven rounds and fourteen races. Michaël Rossi won the title, having battled with Maxime Martin for the entire campaign.

Teams and drivers

Race calendar and results

Drivers' Championship

References

External links
The Eurocup Mégane Trophy website
World Series by Renault results

Eurocup Mégane Trophy seasons
Eurocup Megane Trophy